The Catholic Guides of Ireland  is one of the two Guiding organisations in the Republic of Ireland. It has members in both the Republic of Ireland and Northern Ireland. Catholic Guides of Ireland began in 1928 and thus in 2003 celebrated 75 years of Guiding in Ireland. Together with the Irish Girl Guides it forms the Council of Irish Guiding Associations.

In total three Guide associations operate on the island of Ireland. The other two are Irish Girl Guides (IGG) and Girlguiding Ulster, part of Girlguiding UK.
Emily McCann is the chief commissioner for CGI.

Memberships
The Catholic Guides of Ireland is a member of the Council of Irish Guiding Associations, the national Guiding federation of Ireland. Through this council, it is a member of the WAGGS. The council serves 13,806 Guides (as of 2003).

Age groups

The Catholic Guides of Ireland divides its members into the following age groups: Cygnet Guides, Brigin Guides, Guides, Rangers and adult volunteers.

Cygnet Guides
Cygnet Guides are between 5 and 7 years old. Elements of their Law spell out the word Cygnet thus:

Cares and Shares
Young and Special
Loves God
Is always Neat
Enjoys herself
Tries to be good

Brigin Guides
Girls are Brigin Guides starting at 6 or 7 until 10 years old. There are three levels: bronze, silver and gold. Each level is accomplished by fulfilling 19 challenges. Brigin Guides can also earn interest badges.

Guides
Guides are girls between 10 and 16 years old.
They participate in a wide variety of activities including: the early zoo trip, sailing, cinema, camping, hiking, arts and crafts, anti bullying programs and more.

Rangers
Rangers are girls between 14 and 19 years old.

Trips
Every two years or so the guides and rangers go abroad before they have gone to such places as Denmark. In 2019 some guide groups will be participating in a trip to Switzerland

See also

 Scouting Ireland

References

External links
 http://www.girlguidesireland.ie Official Website
 Photos of 75 years Catholic Girl Guides in Ireland
 https://web.archive.org/web/20061114193913/http://www.templeogueguides.org/ Templeogue Guides, Dublin

World Association of Girl Guides and Girl Scouts member organizations
Scouting and Guiding in Ireland

Youth organizations established in 1928

All-Ireland organisations